The Japan–South Korea football rivalry, between the Japan and South Korea national football teams, is one of many sports rivalries contested between Japan and South Korea. The two have played each other officially since 1954. They have had 81 matches so far with 42 South Korean wins, 23 draws, and 16 Japanese wins. The match between the two countries is often shorten as nikkansen (Japanese: 日韓戦) or haniljeon (Korean: 한일전/韓日戰) in their respective languages.

The highest level of matches which the two nations could contest are the FIFA World Cup (and its qualifiers) and the AFC Asian Cup. Their last meeting in the former dates back to the 1998 qualifiers, while the latter dates back to the 2011 AFC Asian Cup. Friendly matches between the two nations have declined since 2010, partly because of the scheduling conflicts for players in European clubs, and partly because of poor relations between the two countries.

Men's matches

Head-to-head record

List of matches

Women's matches

Head-to-head record

List of matches

See also
 Japan–South Korea sports rivalries

References

External links
 Japan Football Association (JFA) – official website 
 Korea Football Association (KFA) – official website 

International association football rivalries
South Korea
Japan